Ramesh Thilak is an Indian radio jockey and actor who has appeared in Tamil films. He made his breakthrough with Nalan Kumarasamy's Soodhu Kavvum (2013) portraying a kidnapper, before playing a similar role of a thief in Alphonse Putharen's bilingual film Neram.

Career
Ramesh studied master's degree in mass communication at the University of Madras. He worked as a radio jockey with Suryan FM 93.5, and was credited by the radio station as "Thillu Mullu" Ramesh in a reference to his jovial attitude on air. He then simultaneously worked on his first acting assignment, featuring in the character of Azhagesan alias Al Gates in STAR Vijay's college drama serial, Kana Kaanum Kaalangal. Ramesh made his breakthrough in films with Nalan Kumarasamy's Soodhu Kavvum (2013) portraying a kidnapper, before playing a similar role of a thief in Alphonse Putharen's bilingual film Neram. He then also featured in Balaji Mohan's bilingual film Vaayai Moodi Pesavum. He signed on to play his first lead role in Vijay Sethupathi's maiden production Orange Mittai (2015). In 2016, he starred in Oru Naal Koothu, in which he reprised his real life role of a radio jockey, and Mo, a "fun entertainer" that had a "ghost factor".

Filmography

Tamil films

Malayalam films

References

External links

Living people
Year of birth missing (living people)
21st-century Indian male actors
Film producers from Tamil Nadu
Indian male film actors
Male actors in Tamil cinema
Male actors from Tamil Nadu